Adam Frederick Cullen (9 October 1965 – 28 July 2012) was an Australian artist, most known for winning the Archibald Prize in 2000 with a portrait of actor David Wenham. He was also known for his controversial subjects and his distinctive style, sometimes referred to as "grunge". 

He is the subject of the feature film  Acute Misfortune (2019), co-written, directed and produced by Thomas M. Wright, based on journalist Erik Jensen's 2015 biography of the artist, Acute Misfortune: The Life and Death of Adam Cullen.

Early life 
Cullen was born in Sydney on 9 October 1965. He graduated from the City Art Institute (now UNSW Art & Design) with a Diploma of Professional Art in 1987 and received a Master of Fine Arts from the University of New South Wales in 1999. 

He was a cousin of the actor and artist Max Cullen.

Career
Cullen's home and studio was located at Wentworth Falls, in the Blue Mountains of New South Wales.

Cullen's work was exhibited in solo and group exhibitions both in Australia and internationally.  Cullen was well-established as a Sydney "grunge" painter when he won the prestigious Archibald Prize for his portrait of actor David Wenham in 2000. In 2002 he represented Australia at the 25th São Paulo Art Biennial.

Style and themes
He said that he had painted to the music of punk bands such as the Meat Puppets, Black Flag and the Butthole Surfers. Cullen painted such things as dead cats, "bloodied" kangaroos, headless women and punk men, many of which represent what he termed "Loserville".

Cullen often employed the image of infamous and iconic Australian bushranger Ned Kelly in his artwork. He also portrayed the killers of 1986 murder victim Anita Cobby, and illustrated the underworld figure and convicted criminal Mark 'Chopper' Read's fairy tale book called Hooky the Cripple.

The artist used a highly personal visual language to address a broad range of topics including crime, masculinity and cowboy culture. He merged high and low cultural influences in works which are defined by their iridescent colours and bold gestural marks. His works combine irreverent humour with an astute sensitivity to society.

Reception
He has been described as one of Australia's most collectible contemporary artists.

Prizes

Archibald Prize 
He entered the Archibald Prize at least nine times, was hung at least eight times, and won once, in 2000. He was a finalist in 1997, 1999, 2001-2004, 2006 (with his painting Edmund, depicting gallery director and art historian Edmund Capon), in 2011 and 2012.

Other prizes and honours 
Cullen was exhibited in the Doug Moran National Portrait Prize show of 2000-2001 with a portrait of comedian Mikey Robins. He was the winner of the Mosman Art Prize in 2005, having been a finalist in 2000.

In November 2009, the Cullen Hotel, named after the artist, opened in Melbourne.

Later life and legacy
In 2011 he was given a suspended jail sentence for drink-driving and weapons offences. A psychiatric report recommended treatment for bipolar disorder as well as a long-term alcohol rehabilitation program.

He died on 28 July 2012, after having been seriously ill for some time.

Erik Jensen's 2015 biography of Cullen, Acute Misfortune: The Life and Death of Adam Cullen, won the 2015 Nib Literary Award as well as being shortlisted for the Walkley Book Award and the Victorian Premier's Prize for Nonfiction.

Acute Misfortune, directed by Thomas M. Wright, based on Jensen's book, with the screenplay co-written by Wright and Jensen and focussing on Cullen's volatile relationship with his biographer,  was released in 2018.

References

External links 
The Cullen Hotel
The Maker: Adam Cullen

1965 births
2012 deaths
Australian artists
Archibald Prize winners
University of New South Wales alumni
Archibald Prize finalists
Australian portrait painters